Kyron Cassius Daniel Farrell (born 10 May 1996) is a professional footballer who plays for Braintree Town, as a midfielder.

Club career
Farrell began his career with Millwall, signing a professional contract in May 2016.

He moved on loan to Braintree Town in January 2017.

On 15 June 2017, it was announced that Farrell would join National League South side Concord Rangers following his release from Millwall. He moved to Cray Wanderers in March 2018.

He spent the 2018–19 season with Walton Casuals.

Following a three-year spell with Hampton & Richmond Borough, Farrell returned to Braintree Town in August 2022.

International career
Born in England, Farrell was an Irish youth international at the under-19 level.

Career statistics

References

External links
Kyron Farrell at Aylesbury United

1996 births
Living people
English footballers
Republic of Ireland association footballers
Republic of Ireland youth international footballers
Millwall F.C. players
Braintree Town F.C. players
Concord Rangers F.C. players
Cray Wanderers F.C. players
Walton Casuals F.C. players
Hampton & Richmond Borough F.C. players
National League (English football) players
Association football midfielders
Southern Football League players